Shadowzone is a 1990 science fiction/horror film directed by J. S. Cardone.

Plot
NASA Captain Hickock arrives at Jackass Flats Proving Ground, a subterranean research facility. Mostly abandoned in 1962, it now houses “Project Shadowzone”. Hickock has been sent to investigate the death of a Shadowzone test subject and Tommy Shivers, the last of the maintenance staff, escorts him through the facility where they meet Dr. Erhardt, the second in command under Dr. Van Fleet. She introduces Dr. Kidwell, Wiley (the sole computer engineer) and finally Dr. Jonathan Van Fleet. The experiment consists of inducing extended deep sleep (EDS) in the two remaining patients while they’re in sleep chambers. Hickock insists the test be done again with all the same parameters, only longer this time, to prove it isn’t life threatening and Van Fleet reluctantly complies. The male subject’s veins begin to swell and eventually his head explodes. The computer system malfunctions and blows the site’s main power transformer causing an emergency shut down, sealing off the lab.

Van Fleet, Kidwell and Hickock enter the test lab and move the female subject’s sleep chamber into the computer lab when Wiley notices a 5th life form present on the heat signature screen. Erhardt tells them to get out, that “John Doe” has arrived. Van Fleet seals himself in the lab and is attacked and killed. Erhardt explains their sleep experiment uncovered a gateway through the unconscious mind to a parallel dimension where they made contact with a life form (dubbed John Doe). She theorizes that John Doe has entered their dimension through the remaining male test subject. Wiley finds John Doe is no longer on the lab’s heat signature and theorizes the creature can expand/contract its molecular structure at will, (essentially a shapeshifter) and escaped through a drain pipe. The creature, also mildly radioactive, triggers the site’s emergency airlock installed as a failsafe for the nuclear research done in the 60’s, sealing them underground. Wiley and Hickock go to fix the transformer and Shivers and Kidwell go to get the site cook Mrs. Cutter, while Erhardt stays with the female subject (who cannot be woken until the main power’s restored) to monitor her.

When Kidwell investigates one of the lab monkeys screeching, she finds the cage mangled and radios to Shivers to help her search. Meanwhile, Cutter hears one of her rat traps go off. When she reaches into the wall, a massive deformed rat bursts through and tears her arm off. Kidwell finds the monkey and radios to the others but Shivers replies that he already has the monkey with him. Kidwell’s screams are heard over the intercom as the monkey she found mutates and attacks her. Shivers finds Mrs. Cutter’s body and panics, shooting his shotgun wildly in all directions. Wiley and Hickock abandon repairing the transformer and try to find Shivers from the noise he’s making  but only find chunks of flesh splattered on the walls and ceiling. Wiley manually powers up the elevator but it shorts out and only Hickock is able to get inside. Wiley’s blood splatters the elevator window as he’s pulled off screen. Hickock climbs through the top of the elevator and up to the lab’s level.

In the computer lab, Erhardt is fascinated by the creature and theorizes that John Doe not only shape shifts but can take the form of human thought; Kidwell was searching for the monkey when encountering it and Dr. Van Fleet, before he ran off, called out a phobia that was recorded in his psych evaluation, indicating it took the form of his worst fear before killing him. The power suddenly returns as does the creature to the test lab. It takes control of the computer system and tells them it’s dying and needs to return to its own dimension, willing to spare them if they help it get home. Hickock hooks up the female subject  to the test lab and they induce EDS, opening a portal to the other dimension. Erhardt insists on seeing it in person and sticks a metal rod into portal, watching as it’s pulled through. She steps in, briefly disappearing, before stepping back out saying excitedly  “There’s thousands of them!”. The metal rod is shoved out the portal and through her chest. The creature steps out, roars at Hickock and pulls Erhardt’s body through the portal with it. Hickock sets to destroying all the computers with a fire axe before an electric shock throws him back and he’s knocked unconscious. He wakes up to find the female subject awake and he lets her out of the sleep chamber as the credits roll.

Cast
Louise Fletcher as Dr. Erhardt, a 5 year veteran on Shadowzone, she’s calculating and overbearing, not unlike another character Fletcher’s portrayed, Nurse Ratched and is Dr. Van Fleet’s assistant
David Beecroft as Capt. Hickock, a NASA Captain who investigates research related deaths, he goes simply by “Hickock”
James Hong	as Dr. Van Fleet, the lead scientist on Project Shadowzone
Frederick Flynn as Tommy Shivers, his father worked in the facility in the 50’s, he’s the last maintenance man on site for Shadowzone
Shawn Weatherly as Dr. Kidwell, cares for the experiment’s old test animals and acts as the medical examiner for the project
Miguel A. Núñez Jr. as Wiley, the project’s computer engineer 
Lu Leonard as Mrs. Cutter, the facility’s cook

Release
Shadowzone was the second of three films released by Full Moon while using the company name "Full Moon Productions" after 1989’s Puppet Master and followed by Meridian: Kiss of the Beast. After these three films, the company adopted the moniker "Full Moon Entertainment". The film saw an initial release sometime in January or February 1990 distributed by Castle Hill as it was included in a list of new films expected to be released in 1990 in a "Coming Soon" article from the Los Angeles Times published January of that year. It saw a home media release on VHS by Paramount Home Entertainment on February 22, 1990.

Full Moon released the film onto DVD in 2000, but it was discontinued for copyright reasons. It has since been re-released (by Full Moon Entertainment) on DVD several times  and in the Full Moon Classics, Volume 1 box set, containing other Full Moon films like Arcade, Bad Channels, Seedpeople, and Netherworld.

Reception
Starburst Magazine gave the film a positive review and 7/10 stars in 2014, calling it a “little-known offering” but a “pleasant surprise” nonetheless. Reviewer Julian White specifically praised the film’s production design as “attractively rusty and rickety”, the characters as “complex and flawed”, and the script for creating “credible conundrums for the characters to worry about”. He goes on to further commend the film’s casting, praising Hong’s over-the-top performance as Dr. Van Fleet—the scientist who will stop at nothing to see his experiment through as well as Beecroft’s leading man, despite his lack of star power. The pinnacle of the film however, is Fletcher’s performance as “the morally compromised but well intentioned” Erhardt, who White calls “so good it makes you weep with frustration that she wasn't better appreciated by Hollywood”. The review also covers the quality of the DVD itself.

Critic Phil Wheat called the film his "favorite non-franchise Full Moon flick" in a review written for Nerdly in 2014. He specifically praises the creature/gore effects by Mark Shostrom (Evil Dead II & A Nightmare on Elm Street 3: Dream Warriors) as well as the casting of Fletcher and Hong.

HorrorNews.net gave the film 4/5 stars in their review published in 2012. The review argues the film has all the right elements for a good science fiction/horror genre entry, but the execution is lacking. It goes on to commend the special effects and concludes that the films is "overshadowed by films like The Thing which tackle the subject matter a bit more effectively".

The film was also covered as part of "Full Moon Friday" at Cinema-Crazed.com, although it was not recommended. The review mostly argues that the film is boring and is confusing in tone.

References

External links

American science fiction horror films
1990 horror films
American monster movies
1990s science fiction horror films
Films directed by J. S. Cardone
1990 films
1990s monster movies
Films scored by Richard Band
1990s English-language films
1990s American films